The Fremantle Conspiracy is a 1992 Australian mini series based on the 1876 escape by some Fenians from Fremantle Gaol.

Cast
 Nikki Coghill - Hanna
 Bernard Hill - Breslin
 Lloyd Morris - John O'Reilly
 Richard Moir - Hogan

References

External links

The Fremantle Conspiracy at Orana Films

1992 television films
1992 films
Fiction set in 1876
English-language television shows
1990s Australian television miniseries
1992 Australian television series debuts
1992 Australian television series endings
Australian drama television series
Historical television series
Films set in Western Australia
Films directed by Chris Langman